Gonzaga University (GU) is a private Jesuit university in Spokane, Washington. It is accredited by the Northwest Commission on Colleges and Universities. Founded in 1887 by Joseph Cataldo, an Italian-born priest and Jesuit missionary, the university is named after the young Jesuit saint Aloysius Gonzaga. The campus houses 105 buildings on 152 acres (62 ha) of grassland alongside the Spokane River, in a residential setting a half-mile (800 m) from downtown Spokane.

The university grants bachelor's degrees, master's degrees, and doctoral degrees through its college and six schools: the College of Arts & Sciences, School of Business Administration, School of Education, School of Engineering & Applied Science, School of Law, School of Nursing & Human Physiology, and the School of Leadership Studies.

History

Founding
Gonzaga University was founded in 1887 by Italian-American Joseph Cataldo (1837–1928), who had come in 1865 as a Jesuit missionary to the Native Americans of the Pacific Northwest. Cataldo was concerned about the influence and expansion of Protestant schools on the region's native people, and by 1881 was discussing building a Jesuit college with other Jesuit leaders.

The Jesuits chose a location at Spokane Falls (later Spokane) due to its centrality in the Washington, Idaho and Montana region. The Jesuits purchased 320 acres of prime real estate in the city's central business district north of the Spokane River for $936. The Northern Pacific Railway was holding the land in reserve, but Cataldo was able to convince railroad executive John W. Sprague to allow the sale to build the school.

The City of Spokane offered to help pay to build the new college, on the condition that it be a whites only school, in spite of Cataldo's original purpose to educate the local native population. Cataldo's letters seeking the support of Church leadership in Rome warned that Methodists and other Protestants were building schools and that the city funding could go to them if the school was not built soon enough.

Inaugural class
Construction was delayed until 1886, and the school opened in 1887 with Father James Rebmann serving as the first Father Superior and seven boys enrolled. They were taught by 17 faculty, made up of Jesuit priests and Jesuits in training, scholastics. By the end of the year, more students enrolled, and two were expelled, ending the year with a student body of 18 boys, all white. Father Joseph Joset, a Jesuit missionary, attempted to enroll two native American boys but was rebuffed due to the whites-only policy. Father Rebmann told Joset that the school was only open to "Americans," which he did not consider Indians to be. Non-Catholic boys were also rejected, at least in the college's first years.

The students who had been expelled might have run afoul of rules against offenses like theft, disobedience, impurity, or bans on alcohol and tobacco. The boys were supervised at all times, and not allowed off-campus without a chaperone present. They woke at 5:30 AM, and worked continuously until lights out at 8:30 PM. Students attended Mass six days a week, twice on Sundays, and faced often daunting advancement exams. The school was divided into a Preparatory section for elementary school-age boys, an Academic section with Third, Second, and First divisions, and an upper-division like a liberal arts college, for Poetry, Rhetoric and Philosophy. In the second year, enrollment began with 35 boys, 27 of whom were still attending at year's end. By 1890, three of the original 17 faculty members remained. The original Father Superior was followed by Father Charles Mackin, who was replaced in 1891 by Father John Baptist Rene. He served until 1893 and was replaced by Father Leopold Van Gorp.

Students were not allowed to advance to higher forms except upon passage of rigorous examinations. Examinations were rigorous and overseen by the Prefect of Studies. The examinations were so difficult that students would sometimes become very ill from anxiety while preparing for them and some students withdrew rather than face them.

Gonzaga conferred its first Bachelor of Arts degrees to two students. A four-story building was planned in 1897, and opened in 1899 as the New Gonzaga. In 1892, with an enrollment of 50 boys, football, called "college-down", was first played at Gonzaga on Thanksgiving Day. The same year, Gonzaga added a new dormitory, and a wood-framed St. Aloysius Church, and the campus got electric power service for the first time.

Abusive priests sent to live next to campus

In 2018, the Center for Investigative Reporting published evidence that the Cardinal Bea House, owned by the Jesuit order and located next to Gonzaga's campus, was used by the Catholic Church as a retirement home for priests with histories of sexual predation and abuse from across the Pacific Northwest and Alaska, from the 1970s through 2016. Sexually abusive priests were quietly kept there, out of contact with vulnerable populations yet shielded from any liability for the abuse they had committed. The last abusive priest moved out of the Cardinal Bea House in 2016.

The Spokane Spokesman-Review newspaper questioned Gonzaga President Thayne McCulloh's statements that he did not know, before or during his time as president, about the abusive priests kept on campus.

Presidents
 James Rebmann 1886–1890
 Charles Mackin 1890–1891
 John B. Rene 1891–1893
 Leopold Van Gorp 1893–1894
 Lawrence Palladino 1894–1896
 James Rebmann 1896–1899
 George de la Motte 1899–1901
 Joseph Raphael John Crimont 1901–1904
 Francis Dillon 1904–1905
 Herman Goller 1905–1909
 Louis Taelman 1909–1913
 James Brogan 1913–1920
 John McHugh 1920–1921
 Walter Fitzgerald 1921–1927
 Daniel Reidy 1927–1930
 John Keep 1930–1934
 Leo Robinson 1934–1942
 Francis Altman 1942–1945
 Francis Corkery 1945–1957
 Edmund Morton 1957–1961
 John P. Leary 1961–1969
 Richard E. Twohy 1969–1974
 Bernard J. Coughlin 1974–1996
 Edward Glynn 1996–1997
 Robert J. Spitzer 1998–2009
 Thayne McCulloh 2010–Present

Campus

Gonzaga's main campus has 105 buildings on 152 acres in the Logan Neighborhood. The university has two large libraries. Foley Center Library is Gonzaga's main graduate and undergraduate library, opened in 1992. Chastek Law Library primarily serves the Gonzaga University School of Law, erected in 2000. The Rosauer School of Education building was completed in 1994.

Gonzaga hosts many unique pieces of artwork, largely devoted to historical religious figures and prominent Catholics. Among the most notable are statues of St. Ignatius, St. Joseph, St. Aloysius, and alumnus Bing Crosby by Deborah Copenhaver Fellows. The Jundt Art Center and Museum established in 1995 also has a variety of artwork from differing periods. The spires of St. Aloysius Church are a landmark of the Spokane area.

Due to an expanding student body, Gonzaga completed construction of a $60 million building that serves as the new Circulus Omnium Gonzagaorum (COG) "center of campus," the John J. Hemmingson Center which replaced the former COG that students used for over 60 years. The three-story building with almost 4 acres (1.6 ha; 167,000 sq ft) of floor space has an all-glass exterior. It was completed in time for the Fall 2015 semester. It also earned a Gold LEED certification.

In 2014, the university made plans to build a performing arts center named after benefactor Myrtle Woldson that would have a 750-seat theater.

In addition to the campus in Spokane, Gonzaga's virtual campus has degree programs.

Academics
Gonzaga's liberal arts tradition lies in its core curriculum, which integrates philosophy, religious studies, mathematics, literature, natural and social sciences, and extensive writing in each major discipline. Gonzaga has studies in 92 fields and 26 graduate programs. It has programs in preparation for professional schools in business, education, engineering, dentistry, divinity/theology, law, medicine, nursing, and veterinary medicine. It sponsors an Army ROTC program which prepares students to become commissioned officers upon graduation.

Gonzaga partners with Bishop White Seminary, located next to the campus, to prepare Catholic seminarians for the priesthood. Students may study abroad at Gonzaga's campus in Florence, Italy, or at other programs in Australia, Benin, Denmark, China, Costa Rica, England, France, Japan, Kenya, Mexico, Spain and Zambia.

As of 2015, the average class size was 23 students and there were 427 employed faculty; the student-to-faculty ratio was 11.5:1.

Admissions
Gonzaga's undergraduate admission standards are considered "more selective" by U.S. News & World Report.

For the undergraduate Class of 2021 (enrolling fall 2017), Gonzaga received 7,162 applications, accepted 4,835 (67.5%), and enrolled 1,048. The freshman enrolled for 2017 had an average GPA of 3.76, an average ACT of 27, an average SAT Critical Reading score of 597, an average Math score of 607, and an average composite score of 1204.

Rankings

Gonzaga is ranked 79th in the U.S. News & World Report 2020 rankings of national universities. The School of Engineering and Applied Science is ranked tied for 18th best undergraduate engineering program nationwide at schools where doctorates are not offered. Forbes ranks Gonzaga the 170th best school in the country, 110th in private colleges, and 31st overall in the West. Additionally, Gonzaga is listed among The Princeton Review'''s rankings of the best 382 colleges and in the Fiske Guide to Colleges, which ranks 321 colleges in the United States, Canada, and England.

Athletics

Gonzaga University is part of the NCAA Division I West Coast Conference. Their official mascot is the Bulldog and players are nicknamed the Zags. Gonzaga has 16 men's and women's varsity sports, including baseball, basketball, cross country, golf, rowing, soccer, tennis, volleyball, and track & field (indoor & outdoor).

Gonzaga's men's basketball team has 16 WCC regular titles, 6 "Sweet 16's," produced 15 All Americans, a national CBS-Chevrolet Player of the Year and USBWA Oscar Robertson Trophy in Adam Morrison, and 10 NBA first round picks . Additionally, in 2013, Canadian center Kelly Olynyk, a national Player of the Year finalist, was selected as a first team All American. In the 2012–13 season, Gonzaga was ranked No. 1 by the AP for the first time in school history. Its highest ranking before that came in 2004, when the Bulldogs were ranked No. 2. Gonzaga advanced to the Elite 8 of the 2015 NCAA tournament, losing to eventual national champion and No. 1 ranked Duke.

Basketball games are held in the McCarthey Athletic Center. The university's men's basketball team, which did not make its first appearance in the NCAA tournament until 1995 (more than a decade after NBA Hall of Fame player and Gonzaga alum John Stockton graduated), made the regional finals of the NCAA tournament (the "Elite Eight") in 1999, re-appearing in the tournament every year since. The women's basketball team made it to the "Sweet Sixteen" in 2010.

Like many colleges, Gonzaga put its football program on hiatus during World War II; the announcement was made in April 1942. After the war the administration decided not to resume it; the program had been in financial difficulty prior to the war. Gonzaga football produced two Pro Football Hall of Famers: Tony Canadeo (1941) of the Green Bay Packers, and Ray Flaherty (1926), head coach of the Washington Redskins. In addition, Flaherty recruited former Bulldog football stars Ed Justice, George "Automatic" Karamatic, and Max Krause to play in the Redskin backfield.

Intramural and club sports
Gonzaga University has intramural and club sports for each season, open to all students, and over 72% of the student population participates at various levels from competitive to recreational. In the fall, Gonzaga has soccer, flag football, volleyball, dodgeball, 3-on-3 basketball, badminton, and various tournaments. In the winter, it has soccer, ultimate frisbee, pickleball, bench press competitions, innertube basketball, and handball tournaments. In the spring there is softball, volleyball, triathlon, soccer, and home run derbies.

Since the mid-1990s, Gonzaga has become known for its men's basketball program. The Zags (as they are popularly known) have participated in every single March Madness tournament since 1999, and were national runners up in 2017 and 2021. (see Gonzaga Bulldogs men's basketball)

Gonzaga also has an Army ROTC Ranger Challenge team, which has won 15 championships in the last 16 years. It has repeatedly won the Douglas MacArthur Award, given annually to the best Army ROTC program in the Western United States.

Student life

Gonzaga Student Body Association is in charge of the clubs and activities on campus. Elections for its offices (e.g., President, Vice President, Senator) take place annually during the spring.

More than 20 faiths are represented on campus.

Student publicationsThe Gonzaga Bulletin is the official, weekly student newspaper of Gonzaga University. The newspaper is primarily staffed by students of the journalism and broadcasting department of the university's communication arts department; it is managed by a faculty adviser and an advisory board, which reports to the university president. During the 1990s, the paper was recognized for its independence and excellence by the Society of Professional Journalists, winning Best Paper in the Inland Northwest Award twice. The Gonzaga Bulletin is produced on the fourth floor of Gonzaga's College Hall and printed off-site in Spokane.Spires is Gonzaga's official yearbook. It details the academic year through pictures and articles and is distributed at the beginning of each year free to all students. To ensure being included in the yearbook, students have their pictures taken during the opening weekend or Fall Family weekend.Gonzaga Law Review is the law school's flagship legal publication, founded in 1966.Gonzaga Journal of International Law'' is the School of Law's second legal journal, founded in 1997, and is published entirely online, allowing for a variety of publishing dates.

Alumni

Gonzaga University alumni include former Speaker of the United States House of Representatives Tom Foley, former Governor of the State of Washington Christine Gregoire, Academy Award-winning singer and actor Bing Crosby, NBA Hall of Fame basketball player John Stockton, Major League Baseball pitcher Eli Morgan, and world-class mountain climber Jim Wickwire.

See also
 Gonzaga Preparatory School
 List of Jesuit educational institutions
Education in Spokane, Washington

Notes

References

External links 
 

 

 
Educational institutions established in 1887
Jesuit universities and colleges in the United States
Universities and colleges accredited by the Northwest Commission on Colleges and Universities
Catholic universities and colleges in Washington (state)
Association of Catholic Colleges and Universities
Roman Catholic Diocese of Spokane
1887 establishments in Washington Territory